Søren Pallesen (born 7 October 1977)  is a Danish former professional footballer and current head coach, who is the current head coach of fourth-tier Denmark Series club Varde IF.

External links
 Varde IF player profile
 Varde IF manager profile
 Danish national team profile

1977 births
Living people
People from Esbjerg
Danish men's footballers
Denmark youth international footballers
Varde IF players
Esbjerg fB players
Vejle Boldklub players
FC Fredericia players
Danish Superliga players
Danish 1st Division players
Association football midfielders
Sportspeople from the Region of Southern Denmark